Crompton is an English surname.

History
The name was first found in Crompton, England, where the family held a seat from the middle ages.

The Crompton family have a well documented history. Crompton first appears as a family name when the De La Legh family (Norman settlers from the Norman conquest) changed their name to indicate the Anglo-Saxon township they had obtained and settled in during the 13th century. In turn the Crompton family name can be traced back to the time of Magna Carta to the Assize Roll for 1245.

The main lineage of the Crompton family once owned significant country manors and historic properties in the Crompton area, which included the appropriately named Crompton Hall (now demolished), and Crompton House (which is now a church school).

List of people named Crompton
It may refer to:
Alan Crompton (born 1958), English footballer
Andy Crompton, English footballer
Arthur Crompton (1903–1987), English footballer
Ben Crompton (born 1974), English actor
Bob Crompton (1879–1941), English footballer
Charles Crompton (1833–1890), English barrister and liberal politician
Charles Arthur Crompton (1848–1875), English rugby union player
Sir Charles John Crompton (1797–1865), justice of the Court of Queen's Bench
Colin Crompton (1931–1985), English stand-up comedian
Darren Crompton (born 1972), English rugby union player
Drew Crompton, American lawyer of Pennsylvania
Dwayne Crompton (1946–2022), American educator
Ellis Crompton (1886–1953), English footballer
Gigi Crompton (1922-2020), American-British art conservator, botanist and author
Geoff Crompton (1955–2002), American professional basketball player
George Crompton (1829–1886), American inventor, manufacturer, and businessman, son of William Crompton (inventor)
Herb Crompton (1911–1963), American Major League Baseball player
Jack Crompton (1921–2013), English footballer
John Battersby Crompton Lamburn (1893–1972). British author writing popular science as John Crompton
John Crompton (MP), English politician who sat in the House of Commons from 1614 to 1622.
Jonathan Crompton (born 1987), American football quarterback
Kevin Crompton known as CEvin Key (born 1961), Canadian musician
Len Crompton (1902–?), English footballer
Louis Crompton (1925–2009), Canadian scholar
Martin Crompton, English rugby player
Matthew Crompton (born 1971), British actor
Ned Crompton (1889–1950), American Major League Baseball player
Neil Crompton (born 1960), Australian racing driver
Neil Crompton (footballer) (1937–2003), Australian rules footballer
R. E. B. Crompton (1845–1940), British electrical engineer
 Reginald Crompton (1870–1945), British stage and silent film actor and screenwriter
Richard Crompton, British journalist
Richmal Crompton (1890–1969), English novelist and short story writer
Rosemary Crompton (1942–2011), British sociologist and academic
Samuel Crompton (1753–1827), English inventor
Sir Samuel Crompton, 1st Baronet (1786–1827), British politician
Sarah Crompton (1802–1881), English children's writer
Thomas Crompton (died 1601), English MP for Steyning, Radnor, Leominster and Beverley
Thomas Crompton (died 1608), English politician who sat in the House of Commons at various times between 1597 and 1609
Thomas Crompton (Parliamentarian), English politician who sat in the House of Commons at various times between 1647 and 1660
Wilf Crompton (1908–1971), English footballer
William Crompton (politician) (1811–1886), New Zealand politician
William Crompton (inventor) (1806–1891), loom technology inventor

References

English toponymic surnames